Carlos Alberto Ramacciotti (born 29 May 1955) is an Argentine football manager and former player who played as a defender.

Career
Ramacciotti was born in Rosario, and finished his formation with Newell's Old Boys. After making his first team debut in 1973, he went on to represent Godoy Cruz, Atlético Ledesma, Central Norte and Renato Cesarini.

Ramacciotti retired with Cesarini in 1983, and was immediately appointed manager of the club for the 1984 season. He moved to Central Córdoba de Rosario in 1988, and helped the club to achieve promotion to the Primera B Nacional in 1991.

In November 1992, Ramacciotti was appointed Gimnasia y Esgrima La Plata, along with Edgardo Sbrissa. He left in December 1993, and moved abroad in 1996 with Deportivo Cuenca.

After a short period at Club América, Ramacciotti was named manager of Aldosivi back in his homeland in 1998. He was also in charge of Independiente Rivadavia in the following year, before moving abroad again with Blooming in 2000.

In 2001, after a spell in charge of El Nacional in Ecuador, Ramacciotti was appointed manager of Belgrano. He returned to Gimnasia in December of that year, and left in 2003 before taking over Lanús in March 2004.

Ramacciotti returned to Belgrano in 2005, and was in charge of the club during their promotion to the Primera División. In March 2007, he was appointed Nueva Chicago manager, and joined Gimnasia y Esgrima de Jujuy in November.

In November 2009, Ramacciotti was appointed manager of Defensa y Justicia. He left in September of the following year, and returned to Bolivia in June 2011 to take over Oriente Petrolero.

Ramacciotti was dismissed in February 2012, and took over San Martín de Tucumán in June. He was relieved of his duties on 8 February 2013, and was named at the helm of Sportivo Belgrano in April 2014.

On 10 June 2015, Ramacciotti was presented as manager of Peruvian side León de Huánuco, but was dismissed in October. He was named in charge of Juventud Unida Universitario back in his home country on 14 March 2016, but rescinded his contract in June after the club's relegation.

On 31 March 2019, after nearly three years without a club, Ramacciotti returned to Peru and was appointed Sport Huancayo manager. He left in November, and took over fellow league team Cusco FC the following 5 March.

Ramacciotti left Cusco on a mutual agreement on 9 September 2020, but was again named manager of the club nearly one month later.

References

External links

1966 births
Living people
Sportspeople from Rosario, Santa Fe
Argentine footballers
Association football defenders
Argentine Primera División players
Newell's Old Boys footballers
Godoy Cruz Antonio Tomba footballers
Central Norte players
Argentine football managers
Central Córdoba de Rosario managers
Club Atlético Belgrano managers
Club de Gimnasia y Esgrima La Plata managers
Aldosivi managers
Independiente Rivadavia managers
Club Atlético Lanús managers
Nueva Chicago managers
Gimnasia y Esgrima de Jujuy managers
Defensa y Justicia managers
San Martín de Tucumán managers
C.D. Cuenca managers
Club Blooming managers
Oriente Petrolero managers
C.D. El Nacional managers
Peruvian Primera División managers
Sport Huancayo managers
Argentine expatriate football managers
Argentine expatriate sportspeople in Ecuador
Argentine expatriate sportspeople in Bolivia
Argentine expatriate sportspeople in Peru
Expatriate football managers in Ecuador
Expatriate football managers in Bolivia
Expatriate football managers in Peru
León de Huánuco managers
Cusco FC managers